The Gay Ranchero  is a 1948 American Western film starring Roy Rogers. It was filmed in Wildwood Regional Park in Thousand Oaks, California.

Cast
 Roy Rogers as himself
 Tito Guízar as Nicci Lopez
 Jane Frazee as Betty Richards
 Andy Devine as Cookie Bullfincher
 Estelita Rodriguez as Consuelo Belmonte
 George Meeker as Vance Brados
 LeRoy Mason as Mike
 Dennis Moore as Tex

References

External links
 

1948 films
1948 Western (genre) films
Republic Pictures films
American Western (genre) films
Trucolor films
Films directed by William Witney
1940s English-language films
1940s American films